WLJN (1400 AM) & WLJW (1370 AM) are the call letters of 2 AM radio stations located in Traverse City, Michigan and Cadillac, Michigan respectively.  Both stations broadcast Christian talk and teaching programming.  The call letters stand for "We're Lifting Jesus' Name."

FM translators
WLJN and WLJW are also heard on FM translators in Traverse City and Cadillac.

History
Good News Media, Inc. was established in early 1981 to lay the groundwork for getting the station on the air.  Within 2 months after GNMI was started, WTCM changed from 1400 kHz to 580 kHz, opening the way for WLJN to go on the air at the 1400 kHz frequency.  The station's first broadcast day was 2 days before Christmas in 1982. In 1994, application was made by GNMI to broadcast at 104.5 MHz, but nothing came about of it as 104.5 in Traverse City is now home to WZTC.  In 2004, Cadillac radio station WKJF, 1370 kHz, was acquir

ed by GNMI, and became WLJW shortly afterward, simulcasting WLJN. The call letters for WLJW stand for "We're Lifting Jesus' Word."

References

External links
The Source's website

LJN
LJN
Moody Radio affiliate stations
Radio stations established in 1982
1982 establishments in Michigan